The Departmental Council of Guadeloupe is the deliberative assembly of the French department of Guadeloupe. It is based at the Palace of the General Council.

Since 1 July 2021 its president is Guy Losbar, former mayor of Petit-Bourg.

References 

Guadeloupe
Politics of Guadeloupe